Digit is an Indian technology media publisher (magazine and website) owned by 9.9 Group. Digit's tagline is "Your Technology Navigator" and it uses the testing done via its Test Centre and reviewers to provide technology buying advice Indians in seven different Indian regional languages – Besides English and Hindi, it is also available in Bangla, Kannada, Malayalam, Marathi, Tamil, and Telugu.

Digit Magazine 
Digit Magazine is a monthly Indian technology magazine that was launched in June 2001 by Jasubhai Digital Media (JDM) Private Limited, which was then bought over by the 9.9 Group in December 2007. According to the last Indian Readership Survey results that mentioned it (IRS 2011 Q1), it has a readership of about 230,000. The IRS surveys have shown Digit to be the most read technology magazine in India. It is officially circulated only in Indian sub-continent, but also reaches Nepal, Sri Lanka, Oman, Dubai, and some other countries through unofficial channels. It is one of the most expensive monthly magazines in India, retailing at Rs 200 for regular issues and Rs 300 for special issues.

An assortment of Digit Covers 

Each issue of Digit used to includes the magazine itself, two dual-layer DVDs called alpha and omega, a mini-book called Fast Track, a gaming supplement called SKOAR!, a science booklet called dmystify, and a poster or two. Fast Track is an in-depth reference guide on any given sub-topic of information technology, such as web publishing and open source software. The Fast Track series are aimed as an introductory guide to a topic. The dmystify (spelt that way on purpose) is a pocket book that can be considered a dummy's guide to a complex science topic such as General relativity, Quantum Mechanics, String theory, etc. In 2020, owing to the increased penetration of broadband in India.

There are two special issues every year: their Anniversary Special (published in June), and their Collector's Edition (year-end December special). Each of these issues hosts additional content, contests, booklets, calendars and posters, besides the regular contents of the magazine package.

In 2013, Digit introduced a supplement to the magazine named DGT. Mainly it focus on lifestyle technology rather than mainstream technology. This has now been moved into the main Digit magazine as a section and replaced with a SKOAR! supplement.

On 30 May 2014, Digit changed its domain to www.digit.in in order to better reflect its focus on India. On the occasion of the magazine's 13th anniversary, Digit sported a brand new avatar and responsive design for its website with some added features in the form of "Digit Zero1 Award".

The Digit Community

Digit magazine is accompanied by the website www.digit.in, where the latest technology news, reviews, and features are published and discussed by the community. Since 2021, the website is among the most viewed technology websites in India, surpassing the popularity of the magazine itself.

Digit organizes technology events to reach technology enthusiasts, channel members, and technology decision-makers. The events can be in the form of consumer expositions, conferences, roadshows, and channel events.

Digit used to conduct webinars occasionally on technology topics such as careers in technology, how to choose your PC components, and interviews with industry leaders.

Digit Squad
"Digit Squad" is an exclusive group of premier technology enthusiasts in India, who discuss technology-related topics.

Digit awards
Every year, Digit gives out awards to the best technology brands and products in India.

The Icons of Trust Award is given out every year to the most trusted brand in various technology categories. Icons of Trust 2009 was awarded in nine categories:
 Cell phones/PDA, 
 Desktop PCs, 
 Digital Cameras, 
 Monitors, 
 External Storage, 
 HDTVs, 
 Laptops and Netbooks, 
 PMPs, 
 MFDs/Printers

Zero 1 Awards are announced every December for the best technology products released during the calendar year.

See also
CFO India
CTO Forum
Digit Channel Connect
Digit TV
Edu
Fast Track
Inc. India
Industry 2.0
Logistics 2.0
Skoar
School of convergence

References

External links
 Official website of Digit Magazine
 Official Digit Forum

9.9 Media Products
2001 establishments in Maharashtra
Computer magazines published in India
English-language magazines published in India
English-language video game magazines
Home computer magazines
Magazines established in 2001
Monthly magazines published in India
Science and technology magazines published in India
Mass media in Mumbai